= Murder in South Dakota law =

Murder in South Dakota law constitutes the intentional killing, under circumstances defined by law, of people within or under the jurisdiction of the U.S. state of South Dakota.

The United States Centers for Disease Control and Prevention reported that in the year 2020, the state had a murder rate slightly below the median for the entire country.

== History ==
Prior to statehood, the legislature of the Dakota Territory, including what would become both North Dakota and South Dakota, adopted the territory's first Penal Code in 1863. In 1865, this was repealed and "replaced with the code then in use in New York state", under which murder "was not defined by degree and was in all cases to be punishable by death".

This was amended in 1883 to shift the determination of whether the capital punishment was to be imposed from the judge to the jury. The crime became divided between first degree murder, punishable by death by hanging or life imprisonment, and second degree murder, punishable by a sentence of 10 to 30 years.

South Dakota offers no parole for those convicted of murder, asserting that life means life.

== Penalties ==
As of 2024, the sentences for murder convictions are as follows:

Offense	Mandatory Sentencing
First degree manslaughter	Any term of years or life without parole (juveniles cannot be sentenced to life without parole)
Second degree murder	Life without parole (if the defendant was a juvenile, they are sentenced to any number of years)
First degree murder	Death (aggravating circumstances) or life without parole (if the defendant was a juvenile, they are sentenced to any number of years)
